Return to the Blue Lagoon is a 1991 American South Seas romantic adventure film directed and produced by William A. Graham and starring Milla Jovovich and Brian Krause. The film is a sequel to The Blue Lagoon (1980). The screenplay by Leslie Stevens was based on the 1923 novel The Garden of God by Henry De Vere Stacpoole. The original music score was written, composed, and performed by Basil Poledouris. The film's closing theme song, "A World of Our Own", is performed by Surface featuring Bernard Jackson. The music was written by Barry Mann, and the lyrics were written by Cynthia Weil.

The film tells the story of two young children marooned on a tropical island paradise in the South Pacific. Their life together is blissful, but not without physical and emotional changes, as they grow to maturity and fall in love. The film was not financially successful, grossing just $2.8 million on a $11 million budget. Like its predecessor, it was panned by critics. It has an approval rating of 0% on Rotten Tomatoes.

Plot
Set in the South Pacific Ocean in the year 1897, beginning right where the original film left off, a ship finds a little dinghy with three passengers. They quickly find out that the two adults are dead, but the infant snuggled between them lives – a little two-year-old boy who they assume is named "Richard" since that is the only name he knows. After being taken aboard, the baby is given over to the care of Mrs. Sarah Hargrave, a widow who already has a young daughter named Lilli. After the  crew are infected with cholera, Sarah and the children are cast off from the ship. After days afloat, Kearney, a sailor who has been sent with them, tries to kill the boy because of his excessive crying. Sarah angrily beats Kearney to death with a harpoon and dumps his body overboard.

The trio arrive at a tropical island. Sarah tries to raise them to be civilized, as the orphaned boy Richard was born and raised by young lovers on this same island. They grow up, and Sarah educates them from the Bible, as well as from her own knowledge. She cautiously demands the children never to go to the forbidden side of the island.

Eight years later, when Richard and Lilli are 10 and 8 years old, Sarah dies from pneumonia, leaving them to fend for themselves. She is buried on a promontory overlooking the tidal reef area. Together, the kids survive on their resourcefulness and the bounty of their remote paradise.

Six years later, Richard and Lilli grow into strong teenagers. They live in a house on the beach and spend their days fishing, swimming, and exploring the island. Richard lets Lilli win the child's game Easter egg hunt and dives to find her an adult's pearl as a reward. His penchant for racing a lagoon shark sparks a quarrel; Lilli thinks he is foolhardy, but the liveliness makes Richard feel virile.

One day, Lilli awakens with her first menstrual period, just as Sarah told her. Richard awakens with an erection and suffers a nasty mood swing, which he cannot explain. They then get into an argument regarding privacy and Sarah's rules.

One night, Richard goes off to the forbidden side of the island, and discovers that a group of natives from another island use the shrine of an Kon-Tiki-like idol to sacrifice conquered enemies every full moon. Richard hides in the muck and escapes unscathed, despite being seen by a lone native.

After making up for their fight, Richard and Lilli discover natural love and passion, which deepens their emotional bond. They fall in love and exchange formal wedding vows and rings in the middle of the jungle. They consummate their new-found feelings for each other for the next months.

Soon after, a ship arrives at the island, carrying unruly sailors, a proud captain, and his spoiled daughter, Sylvia Hilliard. The party is welcomed by the young couple, who ask to be taken back to civilization. Sylvia tries to seduce Richard, but as tempted as he is by her, he realizes that Lilli is his heart and soul, upsetting Sylvia. Richard angrily leaves Sylvia behind in the middle of the fishpond, in plain view of the landing party.

Meanwhile, Quinlan, a sailor, ogles Lilli in her bath and drags her back to the house. He tries to rape her and steal her pearl before Richard comes to her rescue. Quinlan opens fire on Richard, who flees. Richard lures Quinlan to his death in the jaws of the shark in the tidal reef area.

Upon returning, he apologizes to Lilli for hurting her, and she reveals that she is pregnant. She tells him that if he wants to leave, then she will not stop him, but that she wants to raise their child away from civilization and away from guns. They decide to stay and raise their child on the island, as they feel their blissful life would not compare to civilization. The ship departs and the two young lovers stay on the island and have their baby, a girl.

Cast

Background and production
A sequel to the 1980 film version of The Blue Lagoon was in the works since at least 1979; however, a battle over the rights to the novel between Columbia Pictures and the estate of Henry De Vere Stacpoole, who controlled the rights to the novel outside the United States, delayed the development of a sequel. Because of this, the project remained in limbo until December 1989, when Randal Kleiser told the Long Beach Press-Telegram that the screenplay was nearing completion, and photography would begin in 1990. However, Kleiser would be unavailable to direct, as he would be in Alaska filming White Fang but intended to act as executive producer in association with Frank Price. The film was shot on location in Australia and Taveuni, Fiji.

Reception

Box office
The film was a box-office bomb; on a budget of $11,000,000, it made less than $3,000,000 in the United States.

Critical response
The film exceeded the original for how negatively it was reviewed. On review aggregator Rotten Tomatoes, the film has a rare approval rating of 0% based on 31 reviews, and an average rating of 2.7/10. The site's consensus reads: "Despite its lush tropical scenery and attractive leads, Return to the Blue Lagoon is as ridiculous as its predecessor, and lacks the prurience and unintentional laughs that might make it a guilty pleasure". Audiences surveyed by CinemaScore gave the film a grade of "B" on scale of A+ to F.

Nominations
1991 Golden Raspberry Awards
Nominee: Worst Director – William A. Graham
Nominee: Worst New Star – Milla Jovovich
Nominee: Worst New Star – Brian Krause
Nominee: Worst Picture – William A. Graham
Nominee: Worst Screenplay – Leslie Stevens
Young Artist Awards
Nominee: Best Young Actress Starring in a Motion Picture – Milla Jovovich

Home media

VHS and DVD
 VHS release date: February 5, 1992
 DVD release date: November 5, 2002

Streaming
The 1991 sequel was made available for streaming through various services.

Notes

See also
 The Blue Lagoon, 1923 version
 The Blue Lagoon, 1949 version
 The Blue Lagoon, 1980 version
 Blue Lagoon: The Awakening, a Lifetime television movie
 Paradise
 Friends
 Paul et Virginie, the inspiration for The Blue Lagoon
 State of nature

References

External links

 
 
 
 

1991 films
1990s adventure films
1990s coming-of-age films
1990s teen drama films
1990s teen romance films
American adventure drama films
American coming-of-age films
American romantic drama films
American sequel films
American teen drama films
American teen romance films
Columbia Pictures films
Coming-of-age drama films
Coming-of-age romance films
1990s English-language films
Films scored by Basil Poledouris
Films about virginity
Films about children
Films based on British novels
Films based on romance novels
Films based on works by Henry De Vere Stacpoole
Films set in 1897
Films set in the 1890s
Films set in the 1900s
Films set in 1905
Films set in the 1910s
Films set in 1911
Films set in Oceania
Films set on beaches
Films set on uninhabited islands
Films shot in Australia
Films shot in Fiji
Romantic period films
Films directed by William Graham (director)
1991 drama films
1990s American films